Home accessories are furniture items which are easy to replace and easy to move, and include almost any items that are not strictly functionally necessary in a decorated space. These accessories include such items as curtains, sofa sets, cushions, tablecloths and decorative craft products, decorative wrought iron, and so on. These items are commonly used in indoor furnishings and layout and can include cloth items, paintings, and plants.

The first thing that matters when it comes to sofas with back support is the type of the sofa. Namely, there are plenty of different types of sofas on the market, but, not all of them are for back support. Anyway, here are some of the best sofas for back support.

 Recliner sofa
 Chesterfield sofa
 Massage sofa

Home accessories, as movable decorations, reflect the owner's taste and create a personal atmosphere where they are placed. These items can break the boundaries of the traditional decoration industry, using handicrafts, textiles, collectibles, and things such as lamps, floral items, and plants re-combined to form a new concept. Home accessories vary according to the size and shape of the room space, the owner's living habits, hobbies, tastes, and their financial situation.

References

Interior design